Conscious automatism (C.A.) is a position on the philosophic question that asks whether determinism, as distinguished from “free will”, can be considered the sole operant principle in human decision making.

Position
Conscious automatism holds that we human beings, like the other animals we generally consider our inferiors, are conscious but respond as automata to our prior conditioning (within our physiological powers and limitations) in all of our apparently “willed” decisions. According to this view, the “freedom” we exercise in decision making, a uniqueness that convention leads us to believe distinguishes us from the other mammals, is illusory, for our motives are all, without exception, caused, in the manner we concede that all other changes are causally initiated in the world around us.

Thus in epistemology conscious automatism is the logical conclusion of a strictly determinist explanation of human conduct; it asserts that our decisions have causal determinants. By refusing the compromise between free will and determinism that philosophers have long maintained, conscious automatism produces a controversial corollary: the abandonment of ethicists’ traditional reliance upon the notion of moral responsibility as the foundation of most moral systems and criminal justice institutions.

Use of term

21st century
The term was recently given significant new substance in the book Grandest Illusion: The Seductive Myth of Free Will, by Norman Haughness, which states the case for acknowledging the power of exceptionless determinism in human behavior. In Grandest Illusion the arguments claiming that the human will is free in any or all cases from total dependence on causal antecedents are analyzed and criticized in an effort to reveal the flaws in their coherence and logical validity. This in contrast to most recent literature in the field, such as The Oxford Handbook of Free Will, edited by Robert Kane, whose contributors without exception take positions supporting voluntarism or maintaining agnostic reservations.

Haughness contends that freedom of willing is no more than a faith, which he calls “voluntarism“. He claims that, despite having little empirical basis except in unexamined intuition, free will has been accommodated and, indeed, vigorously defended by philosophers in large part because its abandonment is emotively an extremely repellent notion, suggesting loss of personal autonomy to nearly all who contemplate it. Equally intolerable to many is the fear that, without it, moral responsibility would lose its customarily revered place in society and moral chaos would thereupon necessarily ensue. This problem he addresses only briefly, urging that it is only by changing prior conditioning that conduct can be made conducive to decriminalizing society rather than, as at present, by reliance on ethical norms that are simply not present or are defective in most offenders.

Early use
The term “conscious automata” was employed as long ago as 1874, by Thomas H. Huxley in a famous address he delivered in Belfast titled "On the Hypothesis that Animals are Automata, and Its History". But Huxley's version of conscious automatism was a compromise. He acknowledged the validity of David Hume’s attack  on the popular but illusory notion of a causal nexus, extending it to a firm denial that laws of nature state what “must” occur (admitting only that they state what “will” occur, a distinction that has remained unclear to many). Huxley saw this as an opening to deny that there exist any sort of “iron laws” that necessitate human conduct. He believed in such abstractions as “spirit” and insisted that we possess enough “freedom” to “do our duty” and “do as we like,” obvious exceptions to a thoroughgoing determinist view of human motivation. Thus, at bottom he supported only a conscious semi-automatism similar to the ambiguous views of most contemporary philosophers.

Notes

Sources 
Hume, David; Treatise of Human Nature, 1739.
Huxley, T.H.; Method and Results: Essays, 1893.
Kane, Robert; The Oxford Handbook of Free Will. Oxford: Oxford University Press, 2002.

Theory of mind
Free will